'National Examinations Board  is the board that organizes the Higher Secondary examination and education in Nepal.  It is transformed from previous Higher Secondary Education Board (HSEB) according to the Education Act (8th amendment) of 2073 B.S. It is located in Sanothimi, Bhaktapur. It is the main body that organises board exam. Its main aim is to prepare skilled human power for the development of the country. 

National Examination Board is responsible for conducting and managing 12th grade-Higher Secondary exam and 10th grade  SEE Exam. 

The jurisdiction of the previous Higher Secondary Education Board (HSEB) was limited to 11th and 12th-grade high school (10+2) only. HSEB was established in 1989 under the Higher Secondary Education Act.

See also
 School Leaving Certificate
 District Level Examination

References

Student Help Links
MeroSpark - Reference Notes for Students, Bachelor Level Notes, Question Papers

External links

Education in Nepal